Karukh (Persian/Pashto: كرخ) is a town and the center of Karukh District, Herat Province, Afghanistan. The population is more than 18,800 people. The town is located at 1320 m altitude, 50 km northeast of Herat.Karukh's busy bazaar is continuously mentioned in travelogues down through the centuries. The shrine of Alla Berdi, Sufi ul-Islam, stands there.

Climate
With a mild and generally warm and temperate climate, Karukh features a hot-summer Mediterranean climate (Csa) under the Köppen climate classification. The average temperature in Karukh is 13.1 °C, while the annual precipitation averages 301 mm.

July is the hottest month of the year with an average temperature of 24.9 °C. The coldest month January has an average temperature of 0.7 °C.

Notable people
Rangin Dadfar Spanta

External links
 Nancy Dupree "A historical guide to Afghanistan"
 Census Data

References 

Populated places in Herat Province